Gotta Have You may refer to the following:
"Gotta Have You", by Stevie Wonder from the Jungle Fever soundtrack album
"Gotta Have You", by Eddie Rabbitt from the album Rabbitt Trax
"Gotta Have You", by Sara Evans from the album Slow Me Down

See also
"Got to Have You", by Christina Milian from her self-titled debut album
"I've Got to Have You", by Carly Simon from Anticipation